Ryaki is a village and a community of the Kozani municipality. Before the 2011 local government reform it was part of the municipality of Ellispontos, of which it was a municipal district. The 2011 census recorded 285 inhabitants in the community. The community of Tetralofo covers an area of 18.149 km2.

People
Kostas Peletidis (1953-), Greek cardiologist and Mayor of Patras

See also
List of settlements in the Kozani regional unit

References

Populated places in Kozani (regional unit)